The Cleveland School refers to the flourishing local arts community in Cleveland and Northeast Ohio during the period from 1910 to 1960. It was so named in 1928 by Elrick Davis, a journalist with the Cleveland Press. The Cleveland School was renowned for its watercolor painting, and also included well-known printmakers, sculptors, enamelists, and ceramists.

Artists of the Cleveland School were involved with the founding of the Cleveland School of Art (now Cleveland Institute of Art), the Cleveland Museum of Art, Cleveland Society of Artists, Kokoon Arts Club, and Cleveland's annual May Show.

Cleveland School artists

 George Adomeit
 Russell B. Aitken
 Richard Anuszkiewicz
 Whitney Atchley
 Kenneth F. Bates
 Joseph Boersig
 August Biehle
 Lawrence Edwin Blazey
 Alexander Blazys
 Paul Bogatay
 Jack M. Burton
 Elmer Brubeck
 Charles E. Burchfield
 Martha Burchfield
 Clarence H. Carter
 Claude Conover
 R. Guy Cowan
 Paul Dominey
 László Dús
 Nora E. Dyer
 Harold Edward
 Edris (Edith Aline) Eckhardt
 W. Leroy Flint
 Carl Gaertner
 Clement and Fern Giorgi
Frederick Gottwald
 Waylande Gregory
 Doris Hall
 Harold W. Hunsicker
 A. Drexler Jacobson
 Joseph W. Jicha
 Max Kalish
 Henry Keller
 Grace V. Kelly
 Kalman Kubinyi
 Robert Laessig
 Charles Lakovsky
 Fred Leach
 Hughie Lee-Smith
 Norman E. Magden
 Herman Matzen
 Alice McGinty
 Leza and William McVey
 Carl Moellman
 Joseph Motto
 Charles Murphy
 Horace Potter
 Steven A. Rebeck
 Louis Rorimer
 Charles L. Sallée Jr
 Viktor Schreckengost
 Walt Scott
 Sam Scott
 Marvin Smith (artist)
 Elizabeth Andersen Seaver
 Glen Moore and Elsa Vick Shaw
 William Sommer
 Esther Marshall Sills
 Walter Sinz
 Drew Smith
 Julian Stanczak
 Rolf Stoll
 Paul Travis
 Abel and Alexander Warshawsky
 Frank N. Wilcox
 Sandor Vago
 H. Edward Winter
 Thelma Frazier Winter

See also
Cleveland Artists Foundation

References

3. Folk, Thomas. "Waylande Gregory: Art Deco Ceramics and the Atomic Impulse''." University of Richmond Museums, 2013.

 Cleveland School (arts community)
Culture of Cleveland